Nyankino is a rural locality (a village) in Myaksinskoye Rural Settlement, Cherepovetsky District, Vologda Oblast, Russia. The population was 15 as of 2002.

Geography 
Kodino is the nearest rural locality.

References 

Rural localities in Cherepovetsky District